Daniel Burt (September 14, 1847 – October 16, 1924) was an Ontario farmer and political figure. He represented Brant North in the Legislative Assembly of Ontario from 1895 to 1904 as a Liberal member.

He was born in South Dumfries Township, Brant County, Canada West, the son of Robert Burt, a Scottish immigrant. In 1873, he married Kate Mainwaring. He served as reeve for South Dumfries and warden for Brant county. Burt was also president of the North Brant Agricultural Society and the North Brant Farmer's Institute. As county warden, he was one of the directors of the Brant Memorial Association which erected a monument to the memory of Joseph Brant in 1886. Burt was elected to the provincial assembly in an 1895 by-election after William Bruce Wood retired from office and became registrar for Brant. He was defeated by John Henry Fisher in 1905. In 1909, Burt was named customs collector at Paris and served until 1919. He died at St. George in 1924.

References 
The Canadian parliamentary companion, 1897 JA Gemmill

The life of Capt. Joseph Brant (Thayendanegea) : an account of his re-interment ..., 	Ke-che-ah-gah-me-qua
History of the county of Brant, FD Reville (1920) 
Members of Provincial Parliament, Brantford Public Library

1847 births
1924 deaths
Ontario Liberal Party MPPs
Canadian people of Scottish descent
People from the County of Brant